Darroch Leicester Ball (born 1982) is a New Zealand politician who was elected to the New Zealand parliament at the 2014 general election as a representative of New Zealand First. He was the party's interim president from December 2020 to July 2021.

Early life
Ball was born and raised in Auckland. He attended Liston College (1996–1999) in Henderson, before graduating with a bachelor's degree majoring in biological science from the University of Auckland. He was an army officer and then became a science teacher at Waiopehu College. He is on the board of trustees of Linton Camp School.

Political career

Ball was the NZ First electorate committee vice-chairman in Palmerston North. In October 2013, he was elected the party's vice-president for the North Island. He stood in the Palmerston North electorate in the 2014 election and was elected from the New Zealand First list, where he was ranked 10th.

His party spokesperson portfolios have included "Research, Science and Technology," "Social Policy/Welfare," Civil Defence and Emergency Issues, Consumer Affairs, and Youth Affairs.

Ball hosts a weekly radio programme about New Zealand politics on Access Manawatu, his local community radio station.

In the 2017 general election, Ball contested Palmerston North again. He came third and was re-elected into Parliament on the New Zealand First party list.

In the 2020 general election held on 17 October, Ball unsuccessfully contested Palmerston North, coming fifth. He and his fellow NZ First MPs lost their seats after the party's vote dropped to 2.6%, below the five percent threshold needed to enter Parliament. Two months after the election, NZ First president Kristin Campbell-Smith resigned, and Ball became the party's interim president, saying he expected to hold the role until the party's 2021 annual general meeting. Julian Paul was elected as the permanent president when the AGM was held in June 2021.

Ball put himself forward as a candidate in a by-election for a seat on the Palmerston North City Council in February 2021, but was unsuccessful, coming third.

In early January 2021, Ball became the co-leader of the victims advocacy group Sensible Sentencing Trust. As leader of the trust, Ball criticised the Green Party Co-Leader and minister Marama Davidson for attending a function hosted by the Mongrel Mob gang.

References

External links
1999 photo from Liston College

1982 births
Living people
New Zealand First MPs
Members of the New Zealand House of Representatives
New Zealand list MPs
People educated at Liston College
New Zealand Army personnel
University of Auckland alumni
Association of Community Access Broadcasters
21st-century New Zealand politicians
Candidates in the 2017 New Zealand general election
Unsuccessful candidates in the 2020 New Zealand general election